Amanda Klara Alexandra Davin (born 12 April 1992) is a Swedish actress.

Filmography

Film
Tur & retur (2003)
Allt om min buske (2007)
Wallander (2007)
Patrik, Age 1.5 (2008)
Allt flyter (2008)
Som en Zorro (2012)

References

External links

Swedish film actresses
Living people
1992 births